Vysoké Mýto (also Hohenmauth) is a town in Ústí nad Orlicí District in the Pardubice Region of the Czech Republic. It has about 12,000 inhabitants. Its town square is the largest example of its type in the country. The historic town centre is well preserved and is protected by law as an urban monument zone.

Administrative parts

Vysoké Mýto is made up of town parts of Choceňské Předměstí, Litomyšlské Předměstí, Pražské Předměstí and Vysoké Mýto-Město, and villages of Brteč, Domoradice, Knířov, Lhůta, Svařeň and Vanice.

Etymology
The predecessor of the town was a small settlement by a trade route called Mýto (literally "toll"). After a new town was founded, it adopted the privilege of collecting the toll. The old settlement was renamed to Staré Mýto ("Old Toll") and the new town was called Vysoké Mýto ("High Toll"), probably referring to its location above the old settlement.

Geography
It lies in the Svitavy Uplands. The Loučná river flows through the towns.

History

The first written mention of Vysoké Mýto is from 1265. It was founded shortly before this year by King Ottokar II as one of the trading centres on the trade route from Bohemia to Moravia, and was inhabited by German settlers. The town square and the network of streets were built in a regular shape, which is preserved to this day. Stone walls with three gates were gradually built around the whole town.

In the early 14th century, Vysoké Mýto became a dowry town administered by Elizabeth Richeza of Poland. Thanks to its location on a busy mercantile road it soon became rich. During the Hussite Wars, the town was occupied several times. Most of the German population left the town and Czech citizens became the majority. After the wars, it became royal town of King Sigismund, who donated it to his wife Barbara of Cilli and it became again a dowry town.

Vysoké Mýto was devastated by fires between 1461 and 1517. Thanks to its wealth, the town recovered and new buildings were building, including stone houses on the square, the new town hall, and the Church of the Holy Trinity. In the 16th century, the town prospered and crafts developed. Cloth and knives were exported abroad. The prosperity ended with the Thirty Years' War and several fires in the 18th century.

During the 19th century, new development occurred, and the town became a cultural centre. A Czech-language theatre was established in 1825, the first public library in the region was established in 1839, and the town museum was founded in 1871. At the end of the 19th century, Vysoké Mýto was industrialized and two big engineering and machine-building companies were founded.

Until 1918, the town was part of the Austrian monarchy (Austria side after the compromise of 1867), head of the Hohenmauth District, one of the 94 Bezirkshauptmannschaften in Bohemia.

Demographics

Economy
The largest industrial employer in the town is Iveco's Iveco Bus factory (previously Karosa), brand names Irisbus Crossway, Irisbus Arway and Iveco Urbanway.

Sport
The town's football club is SK Vysoké Mýto. It plays in lower amateur tiers.

Sights

The quadrangle square named Přemysla Otakara II. Square is the largest square of its type in the Czech Republic. The Old Town Hall from 1433 is one of the oldest stone buildings in the town. It was rebuilt several times, last in 1828 in the Empire style. Today it houses the tourist information centre, the Town Gallery and an exposition on the manufacture of car bodies. In the middle of the square is a Baroque Marian column from 1714.

The Church of Saint Lawrence is a large cathedral from the second half of the 13th century. It was reconstructed after the fire in the 16th century, and the near Renaissance belfry was erected in 1585. The current appearance of the church is result of purist restoration from the late 19th century. Nowadays the premises of the belfry are used by the Town Gallery.

The Church of the Holy Trinity was built in the Renaissance style with Gothic elements in 1543.

Most of the town fortification from the 14th century were demolished in the 18th century. Some fragments are preserved to this day, including the Prague Gate and the Litomyšl Gate. The tower of the Prague Gate serves as an observation tower.

The Vysoké Mýto Regional Museum, which was founded in 1871, is the oldest town museum in the country.

Notable people

Bedřich Bridel (1619–1680), writer, poet and missionary
Dismas Hataš (1724–1777), violinist and composer
Alois Vojtěch Šembera (1807–1882), linguist and historian of literature
Josef Jireček (1825–1888), scholar
Hermenegild Jireček (1827–1909), jurisconsult
Hermann Škorpil (1858–1923), Czech-Bulgarian archaeologist and museum worker
Karel Škorpil (1859–1944), Czech-Bulgarian archaeologist and museum worker
František Ventura (1894–1969), equestrian, Olympic winner
Maria Tauberová (1911–2003), opera singer
Ladislav Trpkoš (1915–2004), basketball player
Zdeněk Mlynář (1930–1997), politologist and politician
Marie Málková (born 1941), actress
Josef Krečmer (born 1958), violoncellist
Luboš Kubík (born 1964), football player and coach
Martin Dejdar (born 1965), actor
Jan Jiraský (born 1973), pianist and pedagogue

Twin towns – sister cities

Vysoké Mýto is twinned with:
 Dolni Chiflik, Bulgaria
 Korbach, Germany
 Odessos District (Varna), Bulgaria
 Ozorków, Poland
 Pyrzyce, Poland
 Spišská Belá, Slovakia

References

External links

Museum in Vysoké Mýto

 
Cities and towns in the Czech Republic
Populated places in Ústí nad Orlicí District